Academy of Medicine or Academy of Surgery may refer to:

Asia

Israel
Jerusalem Academy of Medicine

Malaysia
Academy of Medicine of Malaysia

Singapore
Academy of Medicine, Singapore

Europe

Austria
 Josephinian Military Academy of Surgery
 Medical University of Vienna

Belgium
 Académie Royale de Médecine de Belgique
 Koninklijke Academie voor Geneeskunde van België

Denmark
 Royal Danish Academy of Surgery

France
 Académie Nationale de Médecine (1820), which replaced the former Académie royale de chirurgie (1731) and Société royale de médecine (1776)

Ireland and the UK
 Academy of Medical Royal Colleges

North America

United States
By state:
Delaware Academy of Medicine, Wilmington, Delaware, listed on the National Register of Historic Places (NRHP)
Academy of Medicine (Atlanta), listed on the NRHP in Georgia
New York Academy of Medicine
Richmond Academy of Medicine, Richmond, Virginia, listed on the NRHP in Richmond, Virginia

See also
 National academy